The Return of Bruno is the debut studio album by American actor Bruce Willis. Released by Motown Records in January 1987, this album consists of blues, rhythm and blues and soul music sung by Willis, with backing musicians including Booker T. Jones, The Pointer Sisters, and The Temptations. It is a companion piece to an HBO special of the same name, which aired shortly after the album's release. A re-issue was distributed by Razor & Tie in 1997.

Overview
The album peaked at number 14 on the US Billboard 200. In the United Kingdom, the album peaked at number 4 on the UK Albums Chart.  Willis was awarded a US Gold album in March 1987.

The lead single "Respect Yourself", a duet with June Pointer featuring background vocals by the Pointer Sisters, was a hit. It peaked at number 5 on the US Billboard Hot 100, number 7 on the UK Singles Chart and number 8 on the Canadian RPM Top Singles chart. Follow-up singles "Young Blood" and "Under the Boardwalk" did not fare nearly as well, peaking at  number 68 and number 59, in the US respectively. Though "Under the Boardwalk" fared poorly in the US, in the UK the single reached number 2 in the charts and became the UK's 12th best-selling single of 1987. Other singles were released in the United Kingdom, including "Secret Agent Man" (peaked at number 43) and "Comin' Right Up" (peaked at number 73).

Reception and legacy
Reviews of the album were mixed. In February 1987, People magazine gave the album a B+, while calling Willis' cover of "Under the Boardwalk" "surprisingly okay", noting additionally that the album "shows us that he (Willis) can't shout songs quite as well as Don Johnson. So Springsteen he ain't. Funny he is." AllMusic observes that Willis "doesn't quite have the conviction or skill of the Blues Brothers", adding that The Return of Bruno is today little more than a kitsch artifact.

Track listing
"Comin' Right Up" (Brock Walsh) – 3:30
"Respect Yourself" (Luther Ingram, Mack Rice) (originally by The Staple Singers) – 3:53
"Down in Hollywood" (Ry Cooder, Tim Drummond)  (originally by Ry Cooder) – 5:20
"Young Blood" (Jerry Leiber, Doc Pomus, Mike Stoller) (originally by The Coasters) – 4:08
"Under the Boardwalk" (Kenny Young, Arthur Resnick) (originally by The Drifters) – 3:03
"Secret Agent Man / James Bond Is Back" (Steve Barri, P.F. Sloan) / (John Barry) – 4:48
"Jackpot (Bruno's Bop)" (Robert Kraft, Bruce Willis) – 4:12
"Fun Time" (Allen Toussaint) (originally by Joe Cocker) – 3:38
"Lose Myself" (Larry John McNally, Jon Lind) – 3:56
"Flirting with Disaster" (Brock Walsh, Jeff Lorber) – 4:33

Charts

Weekly charts

Charting singles

Certifications

References

1987 debut albums
Bruce Willis albums
Motown albums
1987 soundtrack albums
Television soundtracks